Nicholas John Okwir is a Ugandan accountant, banker and business executive, who served as the founding managing director and chief executive officer of Housing Finance Bank, Uganda's largest mortgagee lender, between November 2007 until December 2013.

Prior to that, from January 1983 until November 2007, he served as the chief accountant of what was then Housing Finance Company, before it was granted a banking licence by the Bank of Uganda in January 2008.

Early life and education
Okwir was born in Uganda circa 1948. After attending local primary schools, he was admitted to Namilyango College, a prestigious all-boys boarding high school in Mukono District, where he graduated with a High School Diploma. He was admitted to the University of Nairobi with a Bachelor of Commerce degree. He went on to study at Strathmore University before he qualified as a Certified Public Accountant.

Career
In 1983, following the conclusion of his professional education in Kenya, Okwir returned to Uganda and took up employment at what was then Housing Finance Company, a government-owned mortgage lender, as the chief accountant, serving in that capacity for the next 24 years.

When the institution received a commercial banking license, Okwir served as the founding managing director and CEO of Housing Finance Bank for five years, until he retired in March 2013.

Other considerations
In 2015, he was appointed to the board of directors of Uganda Revenue Authority (URA), where he is the chairman of the board's audit committee. He also serves as the chairperson of the Federation of Uganda Employers.

References

External links
Website of Uganda Revenue Authority
Housing Finance Bank Limited, Uganda Chooses Polaris' IntellectCore Banking Solution

1948 births
Living people
Alur people
Ugandan bankers
Ugandan accountants
University of Nairobi alumni
Strathmore University alumni
People educated at Namilyango College
Ugandan Roman Catholics
People from Nebbi District
Ugandan chief executives